Julius Steele Barnes (23 February 1792 – 12 November 1870) was an American physician. Besides being a skillful practitioner, and devoted to his calling, he also labored heartily for the social good of the community. He served one term as Connecticut State Senator, and held for a time the office of Judge of Probate.

Biography
Barnes, son of Jonathan Barnes, was born 23 February 1792, in Tolland, Connecticut. His mother was Rachel Steele, of West Hartford, Connecticut., adopted daughter of her maternal uncle, Reverend George Colton, of Bolton, Connecticut, under whose instruction Dr. Barnes was fitted for college. He graduated from Yale College in 1815 and Yale Medical School in 1818, and shortly after commenced practice in Southington, Connecticut, and there continued until his death, 12 November 1870, in his 79th year.

Marriage
He married Laura Lewis, of Southington, who died two years before him. Of their nine children, seven survived them.

External links

1792 births
1870 deaths
People from Tolland, Connecticut
Yale School of Medicine alumni
Connecticut state senators
Physicians from Connecticut
19th-century American politicians
People from Southington, Connecticut
Yale College alumni